Prosper Duvergier de Hauranne (3 August 1798, Rouen – 20 May 1881, Herry) was a French journalist and politician.

External links
Académie française

1798 births
1881 deaths
Politicians from Rouen
French journalists
Writers from Rouen
French male non-fiction writers